Dolphins Basketball Club, also known as simply Phins or Dolphins, is a basketball team based in Gaborone, Botswana. The team plays in the Botswana Basketball League (BBL) and has won the league championship most recently in 2018. In 2020, the Dolphins played in the qualifying tournaments for the Basketball Africa League (BAL).

Trynos Moyo is the current head coach of the team.

Honours
Botswana Basketball League
Winners: 2015, 2018

In African competitions
BAL Qualifiers (1 appearance)
2020 – First Round

References

Basketball teams in Botswana
Road to BAL teams
Sport in Gaborone